Argentina–Spain relations are the bilateral relationship between the Argentine Republic and the Kingdom of Spain. Since a great portion of the immigrants to Argentina before the mid-19th century were of Spanish descent, and a significant part of the late-19th century/early-20th century immigrants to Argentina were Spaniards, the large majority of Argentines are at least partly of Spanish ancestry. Both nations are members of the Organization of Ibero-American States and the United Nations.

History

Spanish colonization

In 1516, the first Spanish expedition to visit what is now Argentina was led by the explorer Juan Díaz de Solís. In 1536, the first Spanish settlement was created in the Río de la Plata basin. Since then, Argentina was formally incorporated into the Viceroyalty of Peru governed from Lima under the Spanish crown. In 1776, the Viceroyalty of the Río de la Plata was created with the head of government placed in Buenos Aires.

Independence

In May 1810, the May Revolution where Argentina declared its independence from Spain. For the next eight years, Argentina, led by José de San Martín, fought Spanish troops for independence. In 1824, Argentina obtained its independence. In 1863, a Treaty of Peace and Amity was signed and thus established diplomatic relations between the two nations.

Post independence
Since obtaining independence from Spain, diplomatic relations between the two nations have been stable. During the Spanish civil war, Argentina remained neutral and gave asylum to any Spanish citizen requesting it without regards to whether they were Republicans or Nationalists. At the end of the war, Argentina maintained diplomatic relations with the government of General Francisco Franco. Maintaining diplomatic relations allowed for the first lady of Argentina Eva Perón to visit Spain in 1947 and donate five million tons of food to the Spanish people.

After the death of General Franco in Spain in 1975, Argentina entered a period of military dictatorship between 1976 and 1983. In 1982, Argentina invaded the Falkland Islands. Spain recognised and supported the claims of Argentine territorial rights over the islands. In 2012, British documents were made declassified and stated that Prime Minister Margaret Thatcher feared that during the Falkland war, Spain would join Argentina by invading Gibraltar. However, as of December 31, 2020, Spain and the United Kingdom reached an agreement on the Gibraltar dispute with their Spanish environment.

A dispute arose in 2012, when Argentina sought to nationalize the energy company YPF, owned by the Spanish multinational company Repsol. Spain warned against such a move stating that it would harm bilateral relations if such a move were to happen. On 16 April, Argentina's President Cristina Fernández de Kirchner announced the nationalization of YPF, to which Spain warned of a "clear and decisive" response. The Argentine government agreed a $5 billion settlement with Repsol over YPF.

In the 2010s an Argentine court accused Antonio González Pacheco, a former police inspector, of committing criminal acts during the Franco regime. He was sought for extradition by an Argentine judge in 2014. María Romilda Servini had called for the indictment. The request for extradition was refused by the Spanish High Court on the basis that the statute of limitations had run out on the accusation against him.

In 2021, Spain pledged support to Argentina vis-à-vis the latter country's negotiations with the IMF to renegotiate on the mechanisms of their debt, singularly those relating to the payment of the US$45 billion borrowed by the Macri administration from the IMF. In June 2021, Spanish Prime Minister Pedro Sánchez paid a visit to Argentina and met with President Alberto Fernández. In May 2022, Argentine President Alberto Fernández paid a visit to Spain.

Cultural cooperation
The Monument to the Carta Magna and Four Regions of Argentina was donated by the Spanish community in 1910, on the occasion of the centenary of the May Revolution. Argentina hosts Spanish Cultural Centers in Buenos Aires, in Córdoba and in the Parque de España, Rosario. In addition, it also has mixed social and sports institutions, such as the Spanish Club of Rosario or the Hispano-Argentino Regatta Club, among many others.

Since May 2014, the Argentine cartoonist Quino, famous for his comic strip Mafalda, received the Princess of Asturias Award for Communication and Humanities. Later, since May 2017, the Argentine humorous-musical group Les Luthiers was also awarded.

Tango and flamenco are two internationally recognized Latin dance genres, recognized as intangible cultural heritage, being emblems of Argentine and Spanish culture respectively. Likewise, they have become popular among the societies of both countries with the exchange of music and dance artists.

In 2020, a twinning tourist guide was established that unites the city of Córdoba in Spain with the counterpart Córdoba in Argentina, trying to take advantage of the aspects that both cities share and that transcend beyond the common name that identifies them, covering linguistic points and cultural.

In January 2023, Argentina sought at FITUR to capitalize its historic relationship with Spain for tourism, forged, among other things, by the family ties that unite both countries. Subsequently, the signing of a twinning and cooperation agreement between the municipalities of Salta (Argentina) and Huelva (Spain) was established. The agreement was made with the aim of promoting the economic and social development of both regions through tourism, production, culture, and gastronomy.

Bilateral
Over the years, both nations have signed numerous bilateral agreements such as an Air Transportation Agreement (1947); Agreement on the Elimination of Visas (1947); Agreement on Migration (1960); Agreement on Cultural Cooperation (1971); Agreement on Scientific and Technical Cooperation (1972); Agreement on Economic Cooperation (1974); Extradition Treaty (1987); Agreement on the Promotion and Protection of Investments (1991); Agreement on mutual recognition of Drivers License (2002) and an Agreement on the Avoidance of Double-Taxation (2013).

Transportation
There are direct flights between Argentina and Spain through the following airlines: Aerolíneas Argentinas, Air Europa, Iberia and Level.

Trade and investment 
In 2017, trade between Argentina and Spain totaled €2.7 billion Euros. Argentina's main exports to Spain include: animal based products, frozen fish, crustaceans and sea mussels, copper and organic chemicals. Spain's exports to Argentina include: automobile components and equipment, electrical material and pharmachemicals. Spanish multinational companies such Banco Bilbao Vizcaya Argentaria, Banco Santander, Mapfre, Telefónica and Zara operate in Argentina.

Spain is the second largest investor in Argentina after the United States, totalling to more than €9.8 million Euros in 2018.

Resident diplomatic relations
 Argentina has an embassy in Madrid and consulates-general in Barcelona and Vigo and consulates in Cádiz, Palma and Santa Cruz de Tenerife.
 Spain has an embassy in Buenos Aires and consulates-general in Bahía Blanca, Córdoba, Mendoza and Rosario.

See also 
 Argentines in Spain
 Spanish Argentines
 Argentina–European Union relations

References

External links 
 Spanish Ministry of Foreign Affairs on bilateral relations with Argentina (in Spanish)

 
Spain
Bilateral relations of Spain
Relations of colonizer and former colony